Tuol Svay Prey II (TSPII) is a quarter (sangkat) of Boeng Keng Kang Section (formerly of Chamkar Mon Section), Phnom Penh, Cambodia.

In 2008 the staff of the Phnom Penh Post wrote that the area, "on the edge of the city", had an "urban" atmosphere, that it was "close to everything" and that it had "a strong sense of community." The newspaper added that "there is not a whole lot to do in the area. Unless you want to drive, the action is fairly limited."

Transport
Monireth Boulevard is to the northwest and Sihanouk Boulevard is to the northeast. The Phnom Penh Post wrote that those two roads, particularly during rush hour, can become congested.

Education
There are no international schools in the community. According to the Phnom Penh Post, Singapore International School is the international school with the most proximity and that "Northbridge International School Cambodia is also very close." The publication described the British International School of Phnom Penh, Home of English, iCAN British International School, the International School of Phnom Penh (ISPP) and Zaman International School as being "slightly more distant".

References

Sangkats of Phnom Penh